Kvicksund is a bimunicipal locality situated in Västerås Municipality, Västmanland County and Eskilstuna Municipality, Södermanland County in Sweden with 1,768 inhabitants in 2010. It is located on the shores of Lake Mälaren. Kvicksund is mainly situated in two different areas, one on the southern shore and one on the northern. The northern part is confined to the island of Nyckelön while the southern part is on the mainland.

References 

Populated places in Södermanland County
Populated places in Västmanland County
Populated places in Eskilstuna Municipality
Populated places in Västerås Municipality